The South Australian Science Council is a body which provides high level, independent science policy advice to the Government of South Australia and to the Chief Scientist of South Australia. It also oversees the implementation of the state's Investing in Science action plan. Prior to June 2015 the council was known as the Premier's Science and Industry Council, and prior to that, the Premier's Science and Research Council. The council was established during the first term of the Rann Government in June 2002 "to advise the government on strategies for boosting local science and research capabilities and improving levels of innovation."

In 2011, the council re-examined its priorities, and focused on the development of the State's science and research capabilities "in the critical area of adaptation to industry." Minister Tom Kenyon said the shift of focus was "in line with the recommendations to revitalise manufacturing as proposed by the ‘Thinker in Residence’, Professor Göran Roos and in the establishment of the Department of Department for Manufacturing, Innovation, Trade, Resources and Energy."

Membership 

Members of the council are recommended by the Chief Scientist then approved by the Minister for Science and Information Economy. As of October 2016, membership of the council includes:
 Dr Leanna Read (chair)
 Dr Drew Evans
 Professor Geoffrey Fincher
 Dr Carolin Plewa
 Professor Karen Reynolds
 Mr Kim Scott
 Dr Meera Verma
 Professor Martin Westwell 
Former members include:
 Dr Nasir Ahmed
 Professor Richard Blandy
 Professor Barry Brook
 Professor Neil Bryans
 Dr Ian Chessell (Chair)
 Professor Edwina Cornish
 Professor Lynne Cobiac
 Dr Patricia Crook
 Professor Ian Davey
 Professor Tim Flannery (Co-Chair)
 Dr Ian Gould
 Lloyd Groves
 Professor Richard Head
 Mike Heard
 Professor Peter Langridge
 Dr Rob Lewis
 Professor Angel Lopez
 Professor Chris Marlin
 Professor Neville Marsh
 Professor Suzanne Millar
 Professor Tanya Monro
 Dr Craig Priest
 Professor Don Roberton
 Paul Sandercock
 Andrew Stock
 Professor Phyllis Tharenou
 Dr Gabrielle Todd
 Dennis Mutton

Notes

References

Advisory boards of the Government of South Australia
Science and technology in South Australia